Henry Bayle (30 November 1917 – 13 November 1991) was a French diplomat who notably served as the French ambassador in Trinidad and Tobago (1962–1966), Cuba (1966–1972), Pakistan (1972–1976) and East Germany (1976–1981).

References

1917 births
1991 deaths
Ambassadors of France to East Germany
Ambassadors of France to Pakistan
Ambassadors of France to Cuba
Ambassadors of France to Trinidad and Tobago